Decalepis is a genus of plants in the family Apocynaceae.

Species include:
Decalepis arayalpathra 
Decalepis hamiltonii 
Decalepis nervosa 
Decalepis salicifolia

References

Apocynaceae genera
Periplocoideae